The Church of San Jorge (Spanish: Iglesia Parroquial de San Jorge) is a church located in Alcalá de los Gazules, Spain. It was declared Bien de Interés Cultural in 2006.

References 

Bien de Interés Cultural landmarks in the Province of Cádiz
Churches in Andalusia